The Artsakh Defence Army is the defence force of the breakaway Republic of Artsakh (Nagorno-Karabakh). Established in 1992, it united previously disorganized self-defence units which were formed in the early 1990s with the goal of protecting the ethnic Armenian population of Artsakh from attacks by Soviet and Azerbaijani armed forces.

History

Establishment

The Artsakh Defence Army was founded on 9 May 1992.  It created "its own central command and military structure distinct from the Armenian Army." Its founders included Robert Kocharyan (the former President of Armenia, he was the first commander-in-chief of the Army); Serzh Sargsyan (former Prime Minister and President of Armenia); Vazgen Sargsyan (Armenia's Defence Minister 1992–93, State Minister in Charge of defence 1993–95, Armenia's Prime Minister 1998–99); Monte Melkonian (responsible for Martuni Province); Samvel Babayan (Nagorno-Karabakh's Defence Minister from 1994 to 2000) and others.  Many of the men who served in its ranks and in the officer corps during the First Nagorno-Karabakh War were seasoned veterans of the Soviet military and had fought in the Soviet–Afghan War.

First Nagorno-Karabakh War

The formal formation of the NKR Defence Army was rooted in the concept of the Jokat (volunteer detachment). With the early outbreak of hostilities prior to 1992, Armenians of Nagorno-Karabakh began forming small detachments of volunteers, often self-described as Fedayeen, inheriting the name of the fighters who actively resisted the Ottoman Empire in the final decades of the nineteenth and early decades of the twentieth centuries.

At the outset these detachments were small groups of no more than 12–40 men. For example, during Operation Ring, Shahumyan was defended by a force as small as 22 men under the command of Tatul Krpeyan.  These volunteer militia would initially arm themselves with whatever was available, including hunting shotguns borrowed from local farmers and even home-made rifles. In the later stages of the war, these units armed themselves with AK-47s, RPGs and sometimes MANPADs, transforming the defence force into a highly mobile and flexible force that was capable of waging guerrilla warfare. Likewise, these units initially had no heavy military equipment, but later started taking over large quantities of Azerbaijani tanks and armored personnel carriers that were abandoned on the battlefield. Most of these captured tanks and APCs later became part of the NKR Defense Army's equipment. Improvization, multi-functionality, creativity, strong-morale, focus on defensive tactics, adaptation, flexibility, high-mobility and a native knowledge of the mountainous terrain are all important factors in understanding the combat success of these small units.

The initial purpose of these detachments, made up of volunteers, was mainly to defend Armenian civilian population, each in a particular village or town.  Each of them was operating independently with no central command or leadership. Yet, these units would regularly collaborate in joint operations such as the battle of Khojaly in February 1992 or the June 1992 surprise counter-offensives during Operation Goranboy. The increasing scale and intensity of Azerbaijani attacks, the devastation caused by Grad multiple rocket launchers firing from Shusha and the Lachin, the blockade from mainland Armenia had broadened the notion of security beyond the mere defence of a small village. Capturing Shusha and Lachin as well as turning the tide of Operation Goranboy became, for the Armenians, not only a matter of security, but that of survival. For the successful conduct of such large-scale operations, the detachments had to be consolidated under a single, unified command.

Mient Jan Faber argues that "August 1992 marked the watershed between purely voluntary Armenian Karabakh forces reinforced by volunteers from Armenia and an organised NKR army with its own central command and a military structure distinct from the Armenian army."

Post war
The Nagorno-Karabakh Defence Army's primary role after the conclusion of the First Nagorno-Karabakh War in 1994 is the protection of the NKR from foreign and domestic threats. Though the war ended with the signing of a cease fire between Armenia, Nagorno-Karabakh and Azerbaijan and the de facto independence of the NKR, the Azerbaijani leadership repeatedly threatened to restart hostilities to retake the region. Violations of the cease fire along the line of contact were frequent and often resulted in the deaths of several soldiers and civilians each year. One of the most significant breaches of the ceasefire occurred in Martakert on 8 March 2008, when up to sixteen soldiers were killed. Both sides accused the other of starting the battle. In June 2010, new skirmishes broke out between Armenian and Azerbaijani troops along the line of contact, resulting in the deaths of four Armenian servicemen. Clashes in summer 2014 resulted in the deaths of six Armenian and thirteen Azerbaijani servicemen. On 12 November 2014, a Nagorno-Karabakh Defence Army Mi-24 attack helicopter participating in the week-long joint Armenian–NKR Unity 2014 military exercises was shot down by the Azerbaijani military, killing all three crew members. On 1 April 2016 large scale clashes began along the line of contact, which lasted for four days and came to be known as the Four-Day War. According to several sources they were the worst since 1994. These clashes culminated in the 2020 Nagorno-Karabakh war, in which the Artsakh Defence Army was defeated while fighting against the military of Azerbaijan and Turkey. Turkish President Recep Tayyip Erdogan Erdogan admitted that Turkey provided military and diplomatic backing to Azerbaijan during the fighting.   Turkey sent 4,000 Syrian ISIS mercenaries to fight against the Armenians.  

In May 2021, President Arayik Harutyunyan announced plans to transform the Defense Army into a professional combat force.

Structure 
The Ministry of Defence serves as the chief administrative body of the Defence Army.

Chiefs of Staff 
 Lieutenant General Anatoly Zinevich (1994–1997)
 Major General Kamo Vardanyan (-11 September 2021)

Defense Districts 

 Central Defense District
 Hadrut Defense District
Martuni Defense District
Askeran Defense District
Shahumyan Defense District

Central Defense District 
NKR self-defense detachments were formed on 22 February 1988.  At the end of 1991 and at the beginning of 1992, more than ten volunteer detachments and detachments were formed in Stepanakert and included more than a thousand fighters. Motorized regiments were then formed on the basis of the following structure:

 1st Motorized Rifle Battalion
 2nd Motorized Rifle Battalion
 3rd Motorized Rifle Battalion

In September 1989, the Central Defense District (also known as the Stepanakert Defense District) was formed on the basis of those battalions. The 8th Separate Motorized Rifle Brigade is part of the district, being formed on 14 October 1992. It is named after "Commander Vazgen Sargsyan".

Hadrut Defense District 
Its first battalion was formed on 16 July 1992. The district was formed in September 1992, in accordance with the order of the Chairman of the Committee for Self-Defense of the Artsakh Republic in August 1992.

Martuni Defense District 
It was formed in September 1991 by the order of the President on the basis of self-defense detachments and platoon operating in the region. The Mataghis Military Unit is part of the district. It was based in the Madagiz settlement of the Martakert Province. In May 2017, the commander and two deputies of the military unit were dismissed after 3 soldiers drowned after their UAZ-315195 vehicle fell into a reservoir. Among its notable commanders was Mikael Arzumanyan, the current Commander of the Defense Army, serving as the commander of the unit at the age of 22.

Shahumyan Defensive Region 
The Yeghnikner ("The Deers") Detachment was founded on 11 March 1993 and is considered to be one of the most elite units of the army of the unrecognized republic. It originated from a partisan unit created by Shahen Meghryan, which was formed on 25 June 1992 from self-defense detachments of the district villages. Among its symbols were the coat of arms of the Meliks of Gulistan and its unit banner. The Shahumyan Defensive Region (SDR) was formed by the Chairman of the Self Defense Committee in March 1993, originally incorporating two battalions Between 1993 and 1994, SDR units participated in battles and operations in Martakert and Shahumyan.

On 2 October 2021, President Arayik Harutyunyan conferred the title of Hero of Artsakh on the commander of the Yeghnikner unit Karen Jalavyan. After the 2020 war, rumors on the Internet claimed that the unit had to leave its positions, which was denied by the commander.

Askeran Defense District 
Askeran Defense District was formed by the order of the NKR IPC President of August 14, 1992. There are 4 rifle battalions in the district:

 1st Rifle Battalion
 2nd Rifle Battalion
 3rd Rifle Battalion
 4th Rifle Battalion

Personnel 
The Artsakh Defence Army is currently composed of around 20,000 officers and soldiers and maintains a "constant state of readiness, undergoing more serious combat training and operational exercises than any other former Soviet army." The Nagorno-Karabakh Defence Army maintains a small air force with a personnel of around 250 men. The Army is a conscript force, with there also being a growing number of professional officers.

Personnel units

Special Forces 
The Special Forces of the Artsakh Defense Army was established in 2000. Based on the previous National Guard, it carries out both of planned and unplanned combat operations. Among its notable commanders were Samvel Harutyunyan. On 11 August 2010, a memorial fountain was unveiled in Aygestan community of Askeran region on August 10 in memory of the fallen soldiers of the Special Forces. The memorial was built with the financial means of the former and current servicemen of the detachment. Their professional holiday is on 5 November.

Engineer Battalion 
The Defense Army has an engineering battalion that is involved in the clearance of minefields of strategic importance. It was formed on 1 February 1995. Roles Aghajanyan was the first head of the Defence Army engineering services.

Educational institutions 

 Vazgen Sargsyan Military University
 Kristapor Ivanyan Military College
 Armenak Khanperyants Military Aviation University
 Yerevan State Medical University Military Faculty

Equipment
The Nagorno-Karabakh Defence Army's equipment consists of infantry, tanks, artillery and anti-aircraft systems. The Karabakh army's heavy military hardware includes: 186 tanks, 68 armoured vehicles, 98 artillery pieces of calibres over 122mm, 44 multiple rocket launchers (most likely BM-21 Grad), and an anti-aircraft defence system of an unspecified type WM-80, Scud-B: at least 4 launchers.

As for infantry, most rely on the AK-74 rifle and older AKMs in reserve for standard-issue rifles. Other basic weapons consist of Makarov PM pistols, PK machine guns, and RPG-7 rocket launchers, all mostly supplied by Armenia. The Nagorno-Karabakh military is deeply integrated with the Armenian military, and the NKR depends on the Armenian Army to ensure its survival as an independent national entity. Armenia considers any act of aggression against Karabakh as an act of aggression against itself.

Ground Forces

Small arms

Armored combat vehicles

Artillery

Air Forces

Military holidays 
Shushi Liberation Day (9 May) and Homeland Defender's Day (28 January) are two military holidays celebrated by the Defence Army. The former commemorates the founding of the military as well as the Capture of Shusha and the traditional Victory Day celebrations commemorating the surrender of Nazi Germany at the end of the Great Patriotic War in 1945. Because of this, it is sometimes referred to as a "triple holiday". An annual military parade is held in the capital, with a reception being held at the local House of Officers in the capital.

Whereas the Armenian Army celebrates Army Day on 28 January, the Defence Army celebrates Homeland Defender's Day on the same day.

See also 
Land mine situation in Nagorno-Karabakh

References

External links 
Important Facts about the NKR Defence Army (Nagorno Karabakh Army). Office of the Nagorno-Karabakh Republic, Washington, D.C.
Official website of NKR Ministry of Defence
Official YouTube Channel of the NKR Defence Army

Military units and formations established in 1992
Military of the Republic of Artsakh
Military of Armenia